A coral island is a type of island formed from coral detritus.

Coral Island may also refer to:

 The Coral Island, an 1858 novel by R. M. Ballantyne
 Coral Island (album), a 2021 album by British rock band The Coral
 Coral Island (TV series), a children's television show adaptation of the Ballntyne novel
 Coral Island, a farming sim PC game created by Indonesian developer Stairway Games
 Ko Hae, an island in Phuket, Thailand